Tanja Weigl (born 14 December 1970) is a German former professional tennis player.

Weigl was a top player in junior tennis, ending 1987 as the third ranked junior in the world. On the professional tour she reached a career high singles ranking of 205 and made the second round of the 1988 Citizen Cup in Hamburg.

ITF finals

Singles: 2 (1–1)

References

External links
 
 

1970 births
Living people
West German female tennis players